Emerson Carvalho de Oliveira (born 16 June 1993), known as Emerson Carvalho, is a Brazilian footballer who currently plays for Treze.

References

External links
 

1993 births
Living people
Brazilian footballers
Expatriate footballers in Poland
Widzew Łódź players
Clube Esportivo União players
Treze Futebol Clube players
Ekstraklasa players
Association football midfielders
São Raimundo Esporte Clube (RR) players
Sportspeople from Rio de Janeiro (state)
People from Magé